Allan Eshuijs (born 31 May 1976, Zaanstad) is a Dutch songwriter, producer and back-up vocalist. He started his songwriting career writing mainly for Dutch and German artists, including Cascada, Yvonne Catterfeld, Ch!pz and Sandy Mölling, but he now also works with US and international artists such as Madcon, Estelle, Taio Cruz, Lost Frequencies, Fedde Le Grand, Dannii Minogue and Macy Gray. His most successful hits to date are "Crazy" by Lost Frequencies & Zonderling, "Evacuate the Dancefloor" by Cascada, which reached #1 in the UK and the Netherlands, and Ch!pz' "1001 Arabian Nights".

Career

Vocalist and music production
Eshuijs began his career as a vocalist after obtaining a bachelor's degree in Vocal Performance at the Conservatorium van Amsterdam in 2000. He founded the music production company GEMINI Music and started working as a backing vocalist and keyboardist for a number of successful national and international artists, including Oleta Adams, Jocelyn Brown, Trijntje Oosterhuis, Candy Dulfer and Ruth Jacott.

Discography

References

1976 births
Living people
Dutch  male songwriters
Dutch record producers
People from Zaanstad
21st-century Dutch male singers
21st-century Dutch singers